The Casa Serra (Serra House) is a building in the Modernisme style in Barcelona, designed by Josep Puig i Cadafalch. It is situated at number 126 Rambla de Catalunya, at that street's corner with the Avinguda Diagonal.

The building was built as a residence between 1903 and 1908, for Pere Serra, although he never actually lived there. It has subsequently served several purposes, and is now the home of the Provincial Deputation of Barcelona.

The section of the building fronting Avinguda Diagonal was demolished in 1981, and replaced by an office building, by Federico Correa and Alfonso Milá, to house the offices of the provincial council (1987). The contrast between the two very different styles was the subject of controversy at the time.

See also 
 List of Modernisme buildings in Barcelona

References

External links 
 

Eixample
Buildings and structures in Barcelona
Josep Puig i Cadafalch buildings
Modernisme architecture in Barcelona
Modernisme architecture
Modernisme
Art Nouveau
Art Nouveau houses
Art Nouveau government buildings
Government buildings in Spain
Houses in Catalonia
Barcelona
Catalonia
Houses completed in 1908
1908 establishments in Spain
Palaces in Barcelona